The denomination is Reformed in theology and Presbyterian in government. It has 3,511 members in 64 congregations. The Apostles Creed and Westminster Confession are the standards.

References

Presbyterian denominations in South Korea